Neil Aaron Symes (born 11 December 1988) is an Australian politician who was the member of the Legislative Assembly of Queensland for Lytton from 2012 to 2015. He was the youngest member of the Queensland Parliament during his term.

Symes was educated at the Anglican Church Grammar School and Griffith University. He graduated with a bachelor's degree in criminology and human services, majoring in child protection and family studies. He has worked at the Acacia Ridge and Districts Community Centre in Brisbane's South-West working as a community engagement officer with the Indigenous and African migrant communities. He also had a pivotal role in organising the multicultural festival, Party on in the Park, in 2009. Before running for Parliament, he was a deli worker at Woolworths.

Political career 
At 23 years of age, Neil Symes was the youngest candidate for the Liberal National Party at the 2012 Queensland state election.

He was elected with 51.1% of the two-party-preferred vote, converting a safe Labor seat with a 12.2-point margin, into a marginal seat with a 1.64-point buffer. The seat had been in Labor hands without interruption for 40 years.

In March 2013, Symes created a furore by taking to Facebook to vent his frustrations over a rally that took place in November 2012, which saw the member for Lytton allegedly being threatened by protesters. In an article posted in The Courier-Mail, Symes warned he would "get his mates on to you" if any such threats took place again.

Symes was defeated by Joan Pease in the 2015 Queensland state election on a swing of over 11 percent, enough to revert Lytton to its traditional status as a safe Labor seat.

Following the 2015 election, Symes resigned from the LNP, and on 3 October 2016 announced via his Instagram account that he had joined Pauline Hanson's One Nation party. He unsuccessfully contested the seat of Mansfield for One Nation at the 2017 state election. He again unsuccessfully contested the seat of Jordan for One Nation at the 2020 state election.

References

1988 births
Living people
Liberal National Party of Queensland politicians
Members of the Queensland Legislative Assembly
People educated at Anglican Church Grammar School
21st-century Australian politicians